Hormathophylla spinosa, formerly Alyssum spinosum, the spiny madwort, is a species of flowering subshrub in the genus Hormathophylla of the family Brassicaceae, native to open rocky sites in south-eastern France and southern Spain. It forms a compact mound up to 30 cm in height. Dense spiny branches of tiny, toothed grey-green leaves bear racemes of white flowers at the tips in early summer.

It is especially cultivated in rock gardens. The cultivar H spinosa 'Roseum', with pink flowers, has gained the Royal Horticultural Society's Award of Garden Merit.

References

Brassicaceae
Plants described in 1753
Taxa named by Carl Linnaeus